Jonas Hildebrandt (born 8 December 1996) is a German professional footballer who plays as a defensive midfielder for Energie Cottbus.

References

External links
 Profile at DFB.de
 Profile at kicker.de

1996 births
Living people
Sportspeople from Frankfurt (Oder)
Footballers from Brandenburg
German footballers
Association football midfielders
RB Leipzig II players
FSV Optik Rathenow players
FC Hansa Rostock players
Rot-Weiss Essen players
FC Energie Cottbus players
3. Liga players
Regionalliga players